Chalcides bottegi, also known commonly as Bottego's cylindrical skink or the ocellated skink, is a species of lizard in the family Scincidae. The species is native to East Africa, the Horn of Africa, and Northeast Africa.

Etymology
The specific name, bottegi, is in honor of Italian explorer Vittorio Bottego.

Geographic range
C. bottegi is found in Ethiopia, Kenya, South Sudan, and Sudan.

Habitat

Description

Behavior
C. bottegi is terrestrial, and it is probably diurnal.

Reproduction
C. bottegi is viviparous.

References

Further reading
Boulenger GA (1898). "Concluding Report on the late Capt. Bottego's collection of Reptiles and Batrachians from Somaliland and British East Africa". Annali del Museo Civico di Storia Naturale di Genova, Serie Seconda [=Second Series] 18: 715–723. + Plates IX–X. (Chalcides bottegi, new species, pp. 719–720 + Plate X, figures 1 & 1a).
Greenbaum E, Campbell AC, Raxworthy CJ (2006). "A Revision of Sub-Saharan Chalcides (Squamata: Scincidae), with Redescriptions of Two East African Species". Herpetologica 62 (1): 71–89. (Chalcides bottegi, p. 78). (in English, with an abstract in French).
Neumann O (1905). "Über nordost-afrikanische und arabische Kriektiere. Im Anschluss an Gustav Tornier's vorangehende Abhandlung ". Zoologische Jahrbücher. Abteilung für Systematik, Geographie und Biologie der Tiere 22 (4): 389–404. (Chalcides bottegi, p. 401). (in German).
Spawls S, Howell K, Hinkel H, Menegon M (2018). Field Guide to East African Reptiles, Second Edition. London: Bloomsbury Natural History. 624 pp. . (Chalcides bottegi, p. 166).

Chalcides
Skinks of Africa
Reptiles described in 1898
Taxa named by George Albert Boulenger